Twisted Kaiju Theater or TKT is a photo-based comedic webcomic by Sean McGuinness created on August 11, 2000. McGuinness created Twisted Kaiju Theater when inspired by a humorous photo comic-strip appearing in ToyFare called Twisted Toyfare Theater (in which TKT has been mentioned twice over the years). Similar in concept, McGuinness poses and photographs figurines in his personal vinyl/action figure collection (most of which consist of Godzilla-based kaiju) in bizarre situations with added dialogue bubbles.

As one of the first and longest running photocomics ever produced, Twisted Kaiju Theater updates twice a week (with a frequent bonus updates), and has over 1,700 episodes. It is a BuzzComix Hall of Famer, achieving the number one position three months in a row, and has maintained a steady position in the top 10 of Top Web Comics for several years. Sean McGuinness has also been a guest of honor at I-CON in 2006 and 2007. In January 2007 and January 2008, Twisted Kaiju Theater was nominated for Outstanding Photographic Comic in the Web Cartoonist's Choice Awards.

On August 11, 2013, thirteen years to the day when the site opened, the site was updated with a message from McGuinness stating that the series was, for now, ending so he could focus on his artwork as That Godzilla Guy. He did mention the possibility of a future revival. The series closed with eight strips released simultaneously.

Style
The art of TKT is done by juxtaposing digital photographs of vinyl/action figures (mostly kaiju) into backgrounds (primarily generated from photos) and photoshopping various effects. This style has alternately been called photocollage, photocomics or fumetti, and McGuinness shares these art techniques with "tutorials" on web photography and specific comic effects. Webcomics which utilize this style or similar techniques include Alien Loves Predator, Insecticomics, Perils of the Bold, and Nukeland Cinema.

When the comic began, figures were posed against props and backgrounds, with word balloons added after photos were taken. As the comic progressed, more advanced techniques were used to improve the quality of the comic. The figures are now shot against a white background, then superimposed with Bluescreen technology over a different background such as a sprawling cityscape. Special effects like Dutch angles, explosions, motion blurs, and Wild Takes have also been added to give a more cinematic and dramatic look. While many of the figures are articulated, McGuinness must use photoshop techniques in order to bring many of the characters to life, such as the figurines for Shin-Goji and the Toxic Pirates, which have no articulation at all.

Plot
The webcomic is set in the fictional land mass known as Neo-Monster Island, populated by the various types of kaiju, mecha, bionicle, comic book and anime characters. The main cast consists of Godzilla and his friends the Toxic Pirates, who are loosely based on Sean McGuinness and his personal circle of friends, all portrayed by Super deformed (SD for short) figurines of Godzilla monsters. The remaining characters stem from a seemingly endless cast of figurines within McGuinness' collection, who make brief or recurring appearances.

The first few seasons revolved around random running gags and toilet humor, the most famous of which revolved around the source of lemon sours received in packaged figurine boxes, which are nothing more than the feces of King Ghidorah. As the comic progressed, longer and more provoking storylines took place, such as Legend of the Dark Mask, Epic and Legends. Most of the time the plots are vehicles to deliver political, social, racial or religious satire while involving one or two fight scenes. Storylines included countless invasions (such as a takeover by Yahoo!), a quest to reshoot a lost episode, and even a journey into Shin-Goji's urinary tract to destroy his kidney stones akin to Fantastic Voyage.

Due to TKT godzilla being inspired by Sean McGuinness, real life events which occur are sometimes reenacted in TKT, even having one of the characters being shown as the creator of Twisted Kaiju Theater, breaking the fourth wall. Comics such as these range from many different topics, such as playing video games or visiting comic conventions.

On April 24, 2009, a notice went up claiming that Twisted Kaiju Theater's website Neomonsterisland.com was under new ownership, and that the series was apparently coming to an end, though there is a listing for an April 27 update on the site at which time the new management claims it will explain what the change in ownership for the website will entail, both for the website and for TKT. The 1500th update to the series depicted a mock-image complete with non-working hypertext links of a 'page not found' page that often comes up when a website has ceased operations.

A short time later, the website was updated, changing its name to 'Once and Future' and then shortly thereafter to 'The Once and Future Tyrant'.

This turned out to be the latest in a series of epic storylines featured in the webcomic, intended to reintroduce the character of Tyrant, a recurring villain who had first appeared in the strip as the president of Yahoo!, who had returned and hatched an elaborate plan to take control of the island for himself, a recurring mission for the character. In this storyline, it was revealed that Tyrant is actually the elder brother of Shin-Goji, who had once ruled the island, but when their mother the Japanese sun goddess Amaterasu asked him to help end the 'War of the Monsters' and he refused, she set events in motion so that Shin would break away from Tyrant (whom she saw Shin as being too dependent upon) and become the leader of the island. She had expected Tyrant to understand. He did not. Instead, he lost his mind, apparently forgetting his true powers, and went on to become a supposed homosexual individual and later the president of Yahoo! He still harbored a desire to reclaim his birthright even in this insane state, which resulted in his numerous attempts to reclaim the island only to be rebuffed by Shin-Goji and the Toxic Pirates numerous times.

The storyline revealed that a previous epic storyline entitled Final Invasion was set up by Tyrant in order to distract Shin from realizing that Tyrant had managed to con him into essentially signing away the rights to the island by slipping in a falsified service provider document. Tyrant was revealed as Shin's elder brother and forced Shin to relinquish control of Neo Monster Island to Tyrant. As a direct result of the supposed 'change in management', the website itself became part of the storyline, allowing it to break the fourth wall. Many fans were at first fooled by the events, while others- namely those on the online forums for the webcomic- were quick to point out that Sean McGuinness, the creator of the series, was still named on the website as the owner of the website and its copyrights.

Tyrant's plan was revealed to be twofold in its goals. Firstly he would regain what he saw as his birthright, and secondly to humble Shin, briefly exiling him from the island. Tyrant and Shin have since reconciled- for the moment at least- and went on a rescue mission to save the Toxic Pirates, who had gone missing during the storyline.

The strip has once again taken on the name Twisted Kaiju Theater, with Shin once again taking a starring role.

Characters

Toxic Pirates

Shin-Goji Small, loud, opinionated, vulgar, and more often than not insensitive and politically incorrect, Shin-Goji somehow leads the uncharted land mass known as Neo-Monster Island. The webcomic focuses mostly on his antics and the trouble he gets himself into. He works at a popular copy and shipping shop. Shin-Goji spent much of the last year absent from the strip except for flashbacks, has only recently returned to the series as a regular character. He has been replaced as the leader of Neo-Monster Island by Tyrant, who was recently revealed to be, in addition to a recurring villain, Shin-Goji's older brother. The two have since reconciled, though Tyrant has stated that if Shin still needs a 'rival' that he is more than willing to fulfill the role of being his 'Resident Evil'.
The figure used is an SD Heisei Godzilla from the Super Collection set, and is also a representation of the author, McGuinness, inserting himself into the comic. Shin-Goji is of Irish descent because McGuinness also is. He does not make an appearance until the second season. Shin-Goji means, literally translated, "True Godzilla". McGuinness chose the name Goji, which is an affectionate, shortened name for Godzilla. The Shin part came from his love of the Street Fighter character Shin-Akuma.

Space Hojo Space Hojo is Shin-Goji's long suffering roommate who does not show up until Season 3. Space Hojo prefers trickery and common sense to keep himself free from the chaos that surrounds him and is usually the result of Shin-Goji's foolishness. Due to a botched Lasik surgery, he was endowed with the ability to shoot laser beams from his eyes. In one of the longer story lines he reveals that he is Nyarlathotep from the H.P.Lovecraft novels. In the same storyline, he claims Cthulhu is his high priest, although in the Mythos Cthulhu was the high priest of Yog-Sothoth.
Space Hojo is characterized by an SD Space Godzilla figure due to its angry and disgruntled look, a trait McGuinness associates with Howard Williams, McGuinness' real life roommate whom Space Hojo is based on. As a result of Williams being African American and being represented by a Space Godzilla figure, the running theme is all Space Godzillas represent black people. Williams has a heavy influence into the development of the comic and many of the controversial strips involving race or racism have been co-written by Williams.

Grendel Grendel is a friend of Shin-Goji and Space Hojo, he shows up around the end of Season 4. A member of the Stormtrooper 501st, he is only seen in his traditional armor and helmet. He serves as a bigger lecher than any of the other Toxic Pirates. As ex-military with a love of firepower, he associates with C-Ball very well.
The figure that represents him is an SD 1984 Godzilla from the Soushingeki set. The head was cut off and replaced with that of a Lego stormtrooper helmet along with armor. The model was created by real life Grendel, who also helps with some other custom figures, including the more recent Steel Pyramid.

MOGUERA Marius MOGUERA Marius was originally represented by a High Grade MOGUERA figure in Season 4. To fit in with the short, super-deformed style of the other Toxic Pirates, he was later associated with an SD MOGUERA from the Soshingeki Collection.
Also a long-suffering victim of Shin-Goji's foolishness, he buries himself in his Taekwondo model painting. His speech is most often reminiscent of Twikki from Buck Rodgers.

C-Ball Sleazeball C-Ball shows up in Season 6, and is the only married Toxic Pirate. He is the most sarcastic and dangerous of the Toxic Pirates.
He is represented by an SD Hedorah from the Soshingeki set (Though he has said he would rather be represented by a "chainsaw doggie"). Sometimes paranoid, and as a gun-nut, he gets along quite well with Grendel. His name comes from a nickname carried by the real-life C-Ball. 
C-Ball has been documented as being able to secrete his own super glue (As mentioned in Epic IX). This ability came into play when C-Ball had to build Mazinger-Z for Shin. C-Ball was placed into a Robotech Valkyrie figure in battloid mode when his original body was destroyed. It acts much like a life support system for him.

Spidersense Spidersense is called The Spirit Warrior, a God-loving man who rocks hard to Dokken. An oddity on the sometimes blasphemous island of Twisted Kaiju Theater, watching over Shin-Goji and the others and making sure they don't stray too far. He also plays HeroClix with the Toxic Pirate crew. His figure is a painted in the colors of Spider-Man.

Thor Thor is the resident manga artist of Neo-Monster Island, having a "special" store of rare artist's ink. Described as "The Manga Fanboy", the character of Thor is represented by a personified (Custom Virus SD), and the butt of many jokes involving the origins of his ink. Thor's daughter makes an appearance as the same but smaller figurine. As a real life artist with published works in Antarctic Press and Radio Comix, Thor helped Twisted Kaiju Theater see actual publication.

Son Goharotto Son Goharotto (Son Go-san for short) is the creator of Saikyo Powaa, and is a moderator of the forums in Twisted Kaiju Theater. He is most remembered for his renditions of half-naked anthropomorphic babes and his temper. He fought Shin-Goji to a stand still when his "Vengeance Seal" was activated.

Big Will Big Will is a Toxic Pirate who joined the team during a time when Space Hojo was not present as a replacement. Despite Space Hojo's return in the strip he has not been removed from the team and is still a member. Apparently he has tried to commit suicide every time Shin accepts fan comics for "fan week". He is portrayed with an SD Destroyah figure.

The Kaiju Girls

The Kaiju Girls (also known as K-Girls) are a gallery of females anthropomorphized after the various Toho kaiju. As opposed to some art sites where females are put into Godzilla costumes, McGuinness was the first to commission anthro art of Godzilla costumes. They started when McGuinness wanted to create a poster girl for the site, which was heavily male dominated. Anthro artist Danny Valentini drew the first girl using specifications from McGuinness. G.I.N.A. (Godzilla Inspired Naked Anthromorph, name by MOGUERA Marius) was drawn reminiscent of Marilyn Monroe's Playboy cover, based on the Godzilla 2000 suit. Soon after each Toho Godzilla monster was envisioned as a Kaiju Girl. There are now 75 or so Kaiju Girls including original creations and girls based on characters like Great Mazinger the more recent Cloverfield monster, as well as other genres, gathered from a series of different artists either by gift art or commission. The galleries are split up into the specific eras of Godzilla movies, as well as original creations, group shots and sprite based art. The galleries range from Rated G to NC-17 for adult situations and nudity.

The Kaiju Girls have been drawn into a few TKT episodes, and models were created by NToonz for other episodes. But when it comes to overall "continuity", any comics which depict them are not considered canon. There are a few fanfics dedicated to the Kaiju Girls — McGuinness ultimately decides if each is to be considered "official" to the overall mythos of the kaiju girls or not.

The site draws some controversy for the Kaiju Girls because of the unregulated adult situations, and from people who find the "furry" genre distasteful. After a conflict with some of the artists who submitted work to his site as gift art, he required all artists to include a disclaimer stating all fanworks sent to Neo-Monster Island/Twisted Kaiju Theater would be regarded as gifts unless otherwise specified, and K-Girls and other such characters would remain the intellectual property of their respective creators. Legal ownership of actual images is given to Shin-Goji/Sean McGuinness with the provision the creators would be consulted in the event of use beyond showcasing. Fanworks submitted by the artists and authors are treated with utmost care and respect, and in return the creators agree they no longer possess sole interest in the managing of their creations.

Artists have started donating Kaiju Girl artwork more rapidly than McGuinness can upload to the site, to the point where Wednesdays are usually devoted to updating and cleaning up the Kaiju Girl archives.

On May 18, 2009, The Kaiju Girls have been removed from the primary website of Twisted Kaiju Theater, and have their own website devoted entirely to them, called DaiKaiju Academy.

As of July 7, 2011, the Kaiju Girls have been removed from the site in their entirety, each character now being maintained solely by their original creators.

Archive CDs
McGuinness sold archive CDs of his work at cost. Volume I contained the first 500 episodes, two CD exclusive cartoons, an exclusive G.I.N.A. picture by manga artist Thor Thorvaldson, and the complete Kaiju Girl archive as of March 17, 2006. Volume II was released in March 2007, and also featured exclusive comics and Kaiju Girl artwork. These CD have since been discontinued and are no longer offered.

Availability and copyright
All strips are available free of charge from the website. McGuinness acknowledges the individual copyrights retained by the vinyl/action figures he personifies and the artists he showcases. McGuinness' work may fall under the fair use doctrine of the United States Copyright Act of 1976.

References

External links
Twisted Kaiju Theater
Twisted Kaiju Theater Myspace Page

Interviews, reviews and publications
Interview on Coloring Dragons
Article in the March 2002 issue of Toyfare Magazine
McGuinness' letter in issue #97 of Toyfare Magazine
Interview with Kaijuice
Interview with Columbia Citypaper
Interview with White Powdered Donuts
Phone Interview with cIndyCenter.com 
Review of TKT on warped.info

2000s webcomics
2000 webcomic debuts
Kaiju
Photocomics